Assigned to Danger is a 1948 American crime film noir directed by Budd Boetticher and starring Gene Raymond, Noreen Nash and Robert Bice. The film's sets designed by the art director Edward L. Ilou. It was distributed by Eagle-Lion Films.

Plot
Frankie Mantell's gang pulls an $80,000 payroll stickup in Los Angeles. But getaway driver Nip Powers is killed and Frankie shot and wounded.

Insurance investigator Dan Sullivan is assigned the case by the company that's been robbed. Following a lead, Dan goes to a mountain lodge. It is run by Bonnie Powers, the dead getaway driver's sister, with the help of Joey, a deaf mute. Dan doesn't disclose his identity, and Bonnie mistakenly believes him to be a doctor.

Frankie and his gang members, Louie, Matty and Biggie, come to the lodge. They are suspicious of Dan, but Bonnie vouches for him. Since he's said to be a doctor, Frankie demands that Dan remove the bullet from his arm. He sends Louie into town to get the necessary instruments.

Dan learns that Bonnie is married to Frankie, but hates him now, not knowing of his criminal nature when they wed. Frankie tells his men to kill Dan if the operation doesn't succeed. Louie panics and tries to leave, so Frankie kills him. Now fearing for Bonnie's life, her deaf employee Joey slips into Frankie's room and suffocates him to death.

The other gunmen shoot Joey and try to prevent Dan and Bonnie from getting away. Dan gets his hands on a gun and manages to overcome them. Bonnie is placed under arrest and charged with harboring a fugitive, but Dan promises to be waiting when she gets out of jail.

Cast

Production
Boetticher had a three-picture deal with Eagle Lion Films.

Reception
Film critic Hal Erickson has praised the film, writing, "An early effort from director Oscar 'Budd' Boetticher, Assigned to Danger was a worthwhile showcase for Gene Raymond, who'd been absent from the screen for several years..Director Boetticher is at his best in the closing reels, slowly and methodically building tension upon tension as Sullivan seeks an avenue of escape."

References

External links
 
 
 

1948 films
1948 crime drama films
1940s crime thriller films
American crime drama films
American crime thriller films
American black-and-white films
American heist films
Eagle-Lion Films films
1940s English-language films
Film noir
Films directed by Budd Boetticher
Films scored by Albert Glasser
1940s heist films
1940s American films